The Tottenham & Hampstead Junction Railway was a railway line in north London, formed by an Act of Parliament of 28 July 1862, which today is mostly part of the Gospel Oak to Barking line. It was effectively part of an attempt by the Great Eastern Railway to obtain a west end terminus to complement Bishopsgate railway station in east London.

The line opened on 21 July 1868 between Tottenham North Junction (on the Great Eastern Railway) and Highgate Road. An extension to Kentish Town opened in 1870. An extension to Gospel Oak opened on 4 June 1888.

History 

Even before it opened, the line had problems. Plans to extend the western end of this line via a proposed 'London Main Trunk Railway', underneath Hampstead Road, the Metropolitan Railway (modern Circle line) and Tottenham Court Road, to Charing Cross were rejected by Parliament in 1864. Instead it was decided to terminate the line at Gospel Oak. The line opened in 1868 with the Great Eastern Railway operating a service between Highgate Road and Fenchurch Street via Tottenham. 

With a very indirect route into central London at one end and no interchange at all at the other, the service was a commercial failure and the planned link to Gospel Oak was never completed. The service ceased operation entirely in January 1870 and a local act was passed in August abandoning the railway in its original form.

During 1870, a branch was constructed to Kentish Town and the line reopened as part of the Midland Railway in October, initially running between Moorgate and Crouch Hill via Kentish Town. In 1872 this was extended to South Tottenham & Stamford Hill. This provided an interchange with the Palace Gates Line. A number of new stations were opened, many of them close to existing stations. Most of these were closed in the 1940s.

In 1888, the line was extended to Gospel Oak (as originally planned) although the Kentish Town branch remained the primary route and the Gospel Oak link was abandoned in 1926. 

In 1894 the Tottenham & Forest Gate Railway opened and the service was extended east of South Tottenham & Stamford Hill to Barking and, occasionally, beyond.

In 1901, a bill was passed authorising the widening of the railway and other improvements. This was followed by a bill in 1902 which gave the Great Eastern and Midland railways joint ownership of the line. The line, along with the rest of Britain's railways, was nationalised in 1948 and became part of British Rail.

In 1981, the Kentish Town branch was closed and the link to Gospel Oak reinstated. For more recent history see the Gospel Oak to Barking line.

Stations 
The line had the following stations (listed from east to west using the original station names):

Tottenham (existing, service abandoned 1870)
South Tottenham & Stamford Hill (existing) (added 1872, replacing Tottenham) [now called 'South Tottenham']
St Ann's Road (new) (opened 1882, closed 1942)
Green Lanes (new) (opened 1880) [now called 'Harringay Green Lanes']
Crouch Hill (new)
Hornsey Road (new) (opened 1872, closed 1943)
Upper Holloway (new)
Junction Road (new) (opened 1872, closed 1943)
Branch:
Highgate Road {Low Level} (new) (opened 1900, closed 1918)
Kentish Town (existing, added 1870, line abandoned 1981)
Highgate Road {High Level} (new) (closed 1915)
Gospel Oak (existing, added 1888, abandoned 1926, line reopened 1981)

Current status 
The branch to Kentish Town closed in 1981 because there was not track capacity at Kentish Town because of the introduction of the Thameslink electrification project. The remainder of the line now forms part of the Gospel Oak to Barking line, part of the London Overground.

References

External links 
Abandoned Tube Stations: GOSPEL OAK - BARKING

Transport in the London Borough of Haringey
Transport in the London Borough of Islington
History of the London Borough of Haringey
History of the London Borough of Islington
Railway lines opened in 1868
History of rail transport in London